Derrymore may refer to:
Australia
 Derrymore, Queensland
Northern Ireland
 Derrymore, County Antrim
Republic of Ireland
 Derrymore, County Kerry
 Derrymore, County Westmeath, a townland in the civil parish of Killucan